WNMB (900 AM, "El Gallo") is a radio station licensed to North Myrtle Beach, South Carolina, United States, and serves the greater Myrtle Beach area. The station is licensed by the Federal Communications Commission (FCC) to broadcast at 900 kHz with a power of 500 watts. The station previously went by the name "AM Stereo 900" and its slogan was "The Sound of North Myrtle Beach." The station most recently broadcast in high fidelity C-QUAM AM Stereo under a beach-oriented oldies format. Until August 1, 2015, WNMB was owned and operated by the family of Bill and Susi Norman who were original employees of the original WNMB when it signed on in 1972. WNMB FM existed from 1972-2000 when it was sold and the callsign changed to WEZV. Soon after, Bill Norman leased the AM station and changed the callsign to WNMB. Norman later purchased WNMB outright and continued the WNMB radio tradition on the Grand Strand. After several changes, the station broadcasts a Regional Mexican format.

FM translators
In addition to the AM frequency of 900 AM, programming from WNMB is relayed to three FM translators on 98.9 MHz, 102.3 MHz and 103.7 MHz.

History
WGSN signed on with a news radio format in the early 1980s. Later, the station aired the same programming as co-owned WNMB, and at one point the station was an affiliate of EWTN Radio.

In 2000, Fidelity Broadcasting moved the callsign WNMB to WGSN when the FM became WEZV. At first, WNMB aired the same easy listening music as WEZV.

The Bill Norman years
Starting in 2001, WNMB was leased by Bill Norman, who managed WNMB FM in the 1970s and returned to the area after 20 years in Albemarle, North Carolina. Norman also became the morning host, while his wife Susi Norman, also a WNMB FM employee in the early days, took the midday shift. Larry Schropp, another member of the WNMB FM team, was the afternoon DJ.

On January 19, 2011, Ted Bell's "All Request Beach Cafe" lunch hour show moved to WNMB from WVCO.  In late April 2011, WNMB owner Bill Norman resurrected WVCO.  Ted Bell moved mainly back over to WVCO (where he had been previously for about 11 years).  However, Bell could still be heard on WNMB as well.  Both radio stations were located together in the WNMB building on Pine Avenue in North Myrtle Beach.

Owner Bill Norman suffered a serious stroke on September 29, 2012, and died at Grand Strand Regional Medical Center on October 14, 2012, from what initially was labelled a "cerebral vascular accident" on the death certificate. On October 19, 2012, the Myrtle Beach Police Department launched an investigation into Norman's death. WMBF-TV reported on December 6–7, 2012, that a 53-year-old nurse, Janet Kupka, had given Norman 20 milligrams of morphine instead of the prescribed 4 milligrams. Kupka allegedly admitted to a witness that she gave Norman the drug Diprivan. Norman was brain dead due to the stroke. Norman's body had been cremated and was not available to be autopsied. The cause of death may be changed to an overdose. In a filing with the FCC, Norman's widow is listed as his personal representative and owns 50% of WNMB in that capacity, in addition to the 50% stake she already held.

After Bill Norman
In 2014, WNMB changed from playing 1950s' and '60s' music to playing music from the '60s, '70s, and '80s. Previously, under Mr. Norman's tenure, the station had played a wide range of true golden oldies and had a considerable audience. Also, Mr. Norman was active in the community and had many advertising clients on his air. After the shift in music, the station's identity changed dramatically. The station did continue serving the community. The North Myrtle Beach High School "Coaches Show" aired Wednesdays and Thursdays during the evening.

On May 15, 2015, it was reported that an agreement had been reached to sell WNMB to Beatty Broadcasting Company for $25,000 with an option to buy the tower site for $150,000. The sale was consummated on August 1, 2015. WNMB was reported in the North Myrtle Beach Times as silent on November 12, 2015, with general manager Gary Beatty citing factors such as "FCC restrictions on the station's signal and the status of AM radio in general" as well as the death of former owner Bill Norman contributing to the decision. The station was listed as "licensed and silent" as of November 12, 2015 in the FCC's CDBS station search.

Sale to Colonial Radio Group
Effective June 21, 2016, Beatty Broadcasting sold WNMB's license to Colonial Radio Group, Inc. (Olean, New York-based Colonial Media and Entertainment) for $1,000. Colonial aimed to relaunch the station in fall 2016. On November 1, 2016 WNMB returned to the air with a gospel format. WNMB later changed formats to classic rock with translator W238CJ, branded first as "95.5 the Beach" and later as "95.5 The Drive". On December 11, 2018, WNMB went silent, but resumed operations on April 23, 2019. In May 2021, the "Carolina Country" format previously heard in the Myrtle Beach area on WMIR-FM moved to WNMB as Andrulonis sold WMIR-FM to another broadcaster. In February 2022, Colonial Radio Group sold WNMB to Gorilla Broadcasting Company for $400,000.

El Gallo
On June 6, 2022, coincident with the consummation of the sale to Gorilla Broadcasting, WNMB’s format was changed from country to Regional Mexican, branded as "El Gallo".

Previous logo

References

External links

WNMB
Radio stations established in 1983
1983 establishments in South Carolina
Spanish-language radio stations in South Carolina
Regional Mexican radio stations in the United States